Twin Township is one of the twelve townships of Preble County, Ohio, United States.  The 2000 census found 2,831 people in the township, 2,315 of whom lived in the unincorporated portions of the township.

Geography
Located in the northeastern part of the county, it borders the following townships:
Harrison Township - north
Clay Township, Montgomery County - northeast corner
Perry Township, Montgomery County - east
Jackson Township, Montgomery County - southeast corner
Lanier Township - south
Washington Township - west
Monroe Township - northwest corner

Part of the village of West Alexandria is located in southern Twin Township.

Name and history
Twin Township was organized in 1808, and named after Twin Creek which runs through it. Statewide, other Twin Townships are located in Darke and Ross counties.

Government
The township is governed by a three-member board of trustees, who are elected in November of odd-numbered years to a four-year term beginning on the following January 1. Two are elected in the year after the presidential election and one is elected in the year before it. There is also an elected township fiscal officer, who serves a four-year term beginning on April 1 of the year after the election, which is held in November of the year before the presidential election. Vacancies in the fiscal officership or on the board of trustees are filled by the remaining trustees.

References

External links
County website

Townships in Preble County, Ohio
Townships in Ohio